The 2021 Tampa Bay Rowdies season is the club's twelfth season of existence, their fifth in the United Soccer League, and third in the USL Championship. Including the previous Tampa Bay Rowdies, this is the 28th season of a franchise in the Tampa Bay metro area with the Rowdies moniker. Including the now-defunct Tampa Bay Mutiny, this is the 34th season of professional soccer in the Tampa Bay region.

Club

Roster

Team management and staff

Competitions

Exhibitions 
The Rowdies initial preseason schedule was announced on March 10, 2021.

USL Championship

Standings — Atlantic Division

Results summary

Results by round

Results

USL Championship playoffs

Bracket

Results

U.S. Open Cup 

On March 29, 2021, the Rowdies were confirmed as one of four representatives of the USL Championship to compete in the Open Cup.
On July 20, it was announced that the tournament would be cancelled for the second straight year, and would resume in 2022.

Honors
 USL Regular Season Champion
 USL Eastern Conference Champion
 USL Atlantic Division Champion

Individual honors
Golden Glove
 Evan Louro
 Coach of the Year
 Neill Collins
 Goalkeeper of the Year
 Evan Louro
 Defender of the Year
 Forrest Lasso
USL All-League
 Evan Louro
 Forrest Lasso
 Sebastián Guenzatti
 Aarón Guillén (second team)

References 

Tampa Bay Rowdies
Tampa Bay Rowdies (2010–) seasons
Tampa Bay Rowdies
Tampa Bay Rowdies
Sports in St. Petersburg, Florida